Phou Xieng Thong National Protected Area is a national protected area in Salavan and Champasak provinces of southern Laos. This park, the country's only park on the Mekong river, is home to a wide variety of animal and plant species, some endangered. The park is an ecotourism destination.

Geography

The park's western boundary is the Mekong river opposite Thailand's Ubon Ratchathani Province. Ubon's Pha Taem National Park is located on the western bank. Near-vertical cliffs rise from the Mekong to the plateau where most of the park is located.

History
In 1983 Phou Kang Heuan, an area within the present park, was declared a Forest Reserve. Logging was ended within current park boundaries in 1992. In 1993 Phou Xieng Thong was declared a National Reserved Forest and National Biodiversity Conservation Area. Wildlife surveys began in 1996.

Flora and fauna
The park's main forest type is semi-evergreen forest.

The native forests of Phou Xieng Thong host a large variety of animals and birds, including endangered species. At least 16 mammal species and 188 bird species have been catalogued.

Animal species include Asian black bear, Sumatran serow, banteng, pangolin, monitor lizard and leopard.

The Phou Xiang Thong Important Bird Area (IBA) is located within the park. The IBA covers an area of  including part of the Mekong's eastern bank.  Endangered bird species in the IBA include green peafowl, grey-headed parakeet and red-collared woodpecker. Bird species rare within the park include red-vented barbet, eared pitta and grey-faced tit-babbler.

Threats
Phou Xieng Thong faces a number of environmental threats. Attempts have been made to create and expand settlements along the Mekong section of the park. Destructive fishing practices, including the use of explosives, have occurred along the park's streams. Hunting of pangolins and monitor lizards is a concern. Logging is on a small scale but poses a long-term threat to forests and bird species.

See also
Protected areas of Laos

References

National Biodiversity Conservation Areas
Protected areas established in 1993
Geography of Salavan province
Geography of Champasak province